Stuart Alan Rimmer (born 12 October 1964) is an English former footballer who is Chester City's record goalscorer. He scored 134 Football League goals in two spells for Chester, and also represented seven other clubs during his professional career.

The early years

Rimmer came through the ranks at Everton but found competition for places incredibly hard. He made his debut as a 17-year-old in a 3–1 win at Swansea City on 1 May 1982, three days before helping the "Toffees" beat Leeds United. His reputation was developed further by being included in the England Youth side for a summer tournament in 1982 in Norway, where he featured in three matches.

He was to make just one more appearance for Everton, in a 3–0 defeat at Wolverhampton Wanderers on 27 December 1983 but with his first team chances not increasing he asked for his name to be circulated to other clubs. This prompted a loan move to Chester City, who were struggling at the foot of Football League Division Four when he joined them in January 1985 under new manager Mick Speight.

The First Chester Spell
There was to be a dramatic start to Rimmer's career with Chester, as he struck a hat–trick against Southend United in a 5–1 win on 26 January 1985. By the end of the season Rimmer had comfortably had finished as the club's top scorer with 14 goals and helped City to mid–table safety. Rimmer had by now joined Chester permanently for a nominal sum made available by the sale of Peter Zelem to Wolverhampton Wanderers for £12,500.

The following season began in explosive fashion, with Rimmer scoring 21 times in the first 23 league and cup games as Chester shot to the top of Division Four. This spell included four goals at Preston North End on his 21st birthday in a 6–3 win. However, he was injured the following month when scoring against Orient, as he collided with goalkeeper Peter Wells and was ruled out for the remainder of the season. Chester soldiered on to win promotion as runners–up in his absence, although they were to struggle to match their early season form and finished 18 points adrift of champions Swindon Town.

Rimmer finally returned to action as a late substitute against Doncaster Rovers on 4 October 1986. He scored two penalties later in the month but it wasn't until the following February that he scored again from open play. He ended the season with 13 goals to his name and was back to his prolific best in 1987–88, prompting the return of scouts from leading clubs to Sealand Road. He had struck 24 times in the league (27 in total) by the time top-flight side Watford signed him for £210,000 (with half of the fee going to Everton) early in March 1988. Rimmer's final goals for Chester had come in a dramatic 3–1 win over Gillingham on 2 March 1988, when he scored three times in the last 10 minutes to turn the match on its head.

The Middle years
Rimmer arrived at Watford in March 1988 with the "Hornets" staring relegation from Division One in the face. Despite scoring on his debut in a 1–1 draw with fellow strugglers Chelsea it was clearly going to be an uphill struggle for Rimmer and Watford, who were comfortably relegated.

The following season saw Rimmer lead a nomadic existence, as he moved on from Watford after only a couple more appearances for £200,000 to Notts County in Division Three. He was shortly off again, following manager John Barnwell to Walsall, who were playing in Division Two in another five–figure transfer. Rimmer made his debut in a 7–0 home thrashing by Chelsea but a week later scored a hat-trick in a shock 3–0 win at Sunderland. Relegation was already looming for the Saddlers, with a similar fate striking the next season despite Rimmer again finishing as the club's top scorer. He began the following season by scoring Walsall's first goal at their new Bescot Stadium.

A brief spell with Barnsley in the closing stages of 1990–91 was largely unproductive, leading to Rimmer making a shock but welcome return to Chester in August 1991.

Return to Chester
Rimmer, who had become Chester's record signing at £94,000 (since broken by Gregg Blundell), made his return for Chester in a 2–0 home win over Fulham on 17 August 1991, with his first goal coming at Wigan Athletic the following week. He scored 15 goals during the season as Chester bravely avoided relegation, with his tally rising to 20 the following campaign when Chester finished bottom of Division Two. This season saw him break the Chester City Football League goalscoring record previously held by Gary Talbot, with his 84th such strike coming in a 2–1 home defeat to Mansfield Town.

The 1993–94 season ended in promotion for Chester as runners–up in Division Three but produced a mere eight goals for Rimmer as he played second fiddle to loan man Graham Lancashire in the closing stages of the campaign. The following season was even worse, as Chester were again relegated and Rimmer struggled to command a regular place under Mike Pejic and spent time on loan with Rochdale and Preston. But Pejic's departure in January 1995 and the appointment of new boss Derek Mann led to Rimmer becoming involved in first–team duties again. He ended the season with just two goals to his name.

The final three seasons of Rimmer's league career (1995–98) were all spent with Chester in Division Three, scoring 13, four and eight league goals respectively in the three campaigns. His final game for the club appropriately saw him have the final word, netting a late equaliser in a 1–1 home draw with Scarborough on 2 May 1998. Despite Rimmer scoring in his last three home games for the club, manager Kevin Ratcliffe opted not to renew his Chester contract.

Rimmer's departure brought to an end his long–running partnership with fellow forward Gary Bennett, who he first played up front with at Chester in 1985, with the pair enjoying three separate spells as teammates at the club.

Life After Football
After leaving Chester, Rimmer left professional football. He joined non–league side Marine.
He has received a warm welcome on his occasional returns to the club to watch a game and when he was involved in the re–naming ceremony for the Harry McNally Terrace in tribute to his former manager.

In March 2007, Rimmer was guest of honour at the Bescot Stadium as Walsall beat Chester 1–0.

Stuart was inducted into the Chester Football Club Hall of Fame in March 2011 at a home game v Salford City, confirming his legendary status amongst the supporter owned club's fans.

Stuart no longer plays football but now enjoys playing cricket for local Southport team (Bedford Park) who are known as the Southport Barmy Army. After a short absence at the end of the 2011 campaign Stuart has come out of retirement to sign again for 2012 where he will fit into his accustomed No 4 slot.

Honours

Everton
FA Youth Cup runner-up: 1981–82

Chester City
Football League Division Three runner-up: 1993–94
Football League Division Four runner-up: 1985–86

Individual
PFA Team of the Year: 1990–91 Fourth Division

Achievements
Football League top goalscorer for Chester City

External links

Rimmer's first 84 league goals for Chester City
Southport Visiter article on Stuart Rimmer
Chester Chronicle article on Stuart Rimmer

Bibliography

References

1964 births
Living people
Footballers from Southport
English footballers
Association football forwards
Everton F.C. players
Chester City F.C. players
Watford F.C. players
Notts County F.C. players
Walsall F.C. players
Barnsley F.C. players
Rochdale A.F.C. players
Preston North End F.C. players
English Football League players
Marine F.C. players